Fodé Camara may refer to:
 Fodé Bouya Camara (born 1946), Guinean footballer
 Fodé Camara (footballer, born 1973), Guinean footballer
 Fodé Camara (footballer, born 1988), Guinean footballer
 Fodé Camara (footballer, born 1998), Guinean footballer
 Fodé Camara (footballer, born 2002), Guinean footballer